Rajawali Sultan Gorontalo Football Club (simply known as Rajawali Sultan) is an Indonesian football club based in Gorontalo City, Gorontalo. They currently compete in the Liga 3.

Honours
 Liga 3 Gorontalo
 Runner-up: 2019

References

External links
 Rajawali Gorontalo FC Instagram

gorontalo (city)
football clubs in Gorontalo
Football clubs in Indonesia
Association football clubs established in 1969
1969 establishments in Indonesia